The  is a group of loosely-connected Japanese filmmakers during the late 1950s and into the 1970s. Although they did not make up a coherent movement, these artists shared a rejection of traditions and conventions of classical Japanese cinema in favor of more challenging works, both thematically and formally. Coming to the fore in a time of national social change and unrest, the films made in this wave dealt with taboo subject matter, including sexual violence, radicalism,  youth culture and delinquency, Korean discrimination, queerness, and the aftermath of World War II. They also adopted more unorthodox and experimental approaches to composition, editing and narrative.

The trend borrows its name from the French Nouvelle vague, a concurrent movement that similarly scrapped the established traditions of their national cinema. Unlike the French counterpart, Japanese New Wave originated within the film studio establishment in an attempt to invigorate local cinema (which was being undermined by television productions) with new ideas from young directors. Failing to thrive within the studio system, these filmmakers eventually formed independent production companies. Most notably, Art Theatre Guild significantly boosted the movement by producing and distributing several of the most renowned New Wave titles.

History 
David Desser in his Eros plus Massacre places the marginal comment:
Superficial comparisons between the Japanese New Wave cinema and the French New Wave, typically to imply greater integrity to the latter, have served the cultural cliché that the Japanese are merely great imitators, that they do nothing original. (...) To see the Japanese New Wave as an imitation of the French New Wave (an impossibility since they arose simultaneously) fails to see the Japanese context out of which the movement arose. (...) While the Japanese New Wave did draw benefits from the French New Wave, mainly in the form of a handy journalistic label which could be applied to it (the "nūberu bāgu" from the Japanese pronunciation of the French term), it nevertheless possesses a high degree of integrity and specificity.

Unlike the French nouvelle vague, the Japanese movement initially began within the studios, albeit with young and previously little-known filmmakers. The term was first coined within the studios (and in the media) as a Japanese version of the French New Wave movement. Nonetheless, the Japanese New Wave filmmakers drew from some of the same international influences that inspired their French colleagues, and as the term stuck, the seemingly artificial movement surrounding it began to rapidly develop into a critical and increasingly independent film movement.

One distinction in the French movement was its roots with the journal Cahiers du cinéma; as many future filmmakers began their careers as critics and cinema deconstructionists, it would become apparent that new kinds of film theory (most prominently, auteur theory) were emerging with them.

The Japanese movement developed at roughly the same time (with several important 1950s precursor films), but arose as more of a movement devoted to questioning, analyzing, critiquing and (at times) upsetting social conventions.

One Japanese filmmaker who did emerge from a background akin to his French colleagues was Nagisa Oshima, who had been a leftist activist and an analytical film critic before being hired by a studio.  Oshima's earliest films (1959–60) could be seen as direct outgrowths of opinions voiced in his earlier published analysis.  Cruel Story of Youth, Oshima's landmark second film (one of four he directed in 1959 and 1960) saw an international release very immediately in the wake of Jean-Luc Godard's Breathless and François Truffaut's The 400 Blows.

Directors and themes 
Directors initially associated with the Japanese New Wave included Susumu Hani, Hiroshi Teshigahara, Koreyoshi Kurahara, Yasuzo Masumura, Masahiro Shinoda, Nagisa Oshima, Yoshishige Yoshida, Shōhei Imamura and Terayama Shūji.  Certain other filmmakers who had already launched careers – Seijun Suzuki, Kō Nakahira, Masaki Kobayashi, and Kaneto Shindo also came to be occasionally associated with the movement.

Working separately, they explored a number of ideas previously not often seen in more traditional Japanese cinema:  social outcasts as protagonists (including criminals or delinquents), uninhibited sexuality, changing roles of women in society, racism and the position of ethnic minorities in Japan, and the critique of (or deconstruction of) social structures and assumptions.  Protagonists like Tome from Imamura's The Insect Woman (1963) or the adolescent delinquents of Oshima's Cruel Story of Youth (1960) represented rebellion, but also gave domestic and international audiences a glimpse into lives that would otherwise likely escape cinematic attention.

Susumu Hani 
Unlike other Japanese New Wave filmmakers, Susumu Hani directed his works almost entirely outside of the major studios.  Hani moved into feature filmmaking from an earlier career in documentary film, and favored non-actors and improvisation when possible.  The documentaries Hani had made during the 1950s (1954's Children in the Classroom, and 1956's Children Who Draw) had introduced a style of cinema verite documentary to Japan, and were of great interest to other filmmakers.

Hani's 1961 feature debut, Bad Boys was based upon the actual experiences of the disaffected youth seen in a reformatory; Hani felt that casting the same youth as actors would lend his film authenticity, blurring the lines between fiction and documentary in the process.

Hani would go on to complete several other features through the 1960s – among them the Antonioni-like She and He (1963), Song of Bwana Toshi (1965), which dramatizes a spiritually and psychologically-themed journey to East Africa undertaken by a Japanese engineer facing family difficulties, and Nanami, The Inferno of First Love (1968).  Hani, who was one of few true independents within the movement (and was – for this reason – one of its real cornerstones) would later retreat from feature filmmaking, primarily out of disillusionment:

I do not admire people, though I admire many persons.  But I don't like what society does to persons.  It perverts them.  Yet, I don't want to attack society.  I am not that kind of person.  What I would like to do is ignore it.  Or better, show something else.  This is what I have done in my pictures, including the animal ones

Many of Hani's subsequent nature films were shot in Africa, an area he first explored in the Song of Bwana Toshi.  Though fiction, the feature film presaged Hani's later professional moves, and – in its theme of a man's attempt to "find himself", it stands as one of the more personally revelatory examples of Japanese New Wave filmmaking, revealing the direct human ambitions situated underneath the styles closer to the movement's surface.

Shōhei Imamura 
Alongside Nagisa Oshima, Shōhei Imamura became one of the more famous of the Japanese New Wave filmmakers.  Imamura's work was less overtly political than Oshima or several filmmakers who emerged later in the 1960s.  Nevertheless, Imamura in many ways became a standard-bearer for the Japanese New Wave:  through his last feature (Warm Water Under a Red Bridge, 2001), Imamura never lost interest in his trademark characters and settings.

Imamura had once been an assistant of Yasujirō Ozu, and had – in his youth – developed an antipathy towards Ozu's (and Kenji Mizoguchi's) finely crafted aestheticism, finding it to be a bit too tailored to approved senses of "Japanese" film.  Imamura's preference was for people whose lives were messier and for settings less lovely:  amateur pornographers, barmaids, an elderly one-time prostitute, murderers, unemployed salarymen, an obsessive-compulsive doctor, and a lecherous, alcoholic monk were a few of his many protagonists.

Imamura stated this on a number of occasions:
If my films are messy, it is probably because I don't like too perfect a cinema.  The audience must not admire the technical aspects of my filmmaking, as they would a computer or the laws of physics.

Imamura continued:
I love all the characters in my films, even the loutish and frivolous ones. I want every one of my shots to express this love.  I'm interested in people, strong, greedy, humorous, deceitful people who are very human in their qualities and their failings.

In integrating such a social view into a creative stance, Imamura – in an oblique fashion – does reflect the humanist formalism of earlier filmmakers – Ozu, and Kurosawa (whose Drunken Angel he cited as a primary inspiration), even when the episodic construction seems more akin to the global (and Japanese) New Wave.

Thus, where Oshima would seem to strive for a radical break between old and new in Japanese cinema, figures like Imamura (and Seijun Suzuki) instead took older ideologies (and older, little-explored tangents), and helped create a Japanese New Wave that instead stood as an inevitable evolution in a dynamic cinema.

Nagisa Oshima 
Nagisa Oshima was among the most prolific Japanese New Wave filmmakers, and – by virtue of having had several internationally successful films (notably 1960's Cruel Story of Youth, 1976's In the Realm of the Senses and 1983's Merry Christmas, Mr. Lawrence), became one of the most famous filmmakers associated with the movement.

Certain films – in particular Oshima's Cruel Story of Youth, Night and Fog in Japan (1960), and his later Death by Hanging (1968) – did generate enormous controversy (Night and Fog in Japan was pulled from theatres one week into its release). They also provoked debate, or – in some instances – became unexpected commercial successes.  Violence at Noon (1966) received a nomination for the Silver Bear at the Berlin Film Festival.

Oshima's structural and political restlessness and willingness to disrupt cinematic formulas drew comparisons to Jean-Luc Godard – the two filmmakers emerged globally almost simultaneously, both were interested in altering the form and processes of cinema, both came from backgrounds as critics, both challenged definitions of cinema as entertainment by inserting their own political perspectives into their work.  Oshima elaborated upon the comparison:

I don't agree specifically with any of his positions, but I agree with his general attitude in confronting political themes seriously in film.

Oshima varied his style dramatically to serve the needs of specific films – long takes in Night and Fog in Japan (1960), a blizzard of quick jump cuts in  Violence at Noon (1966), nearly neo-realistic in Boy (Shonen, 1969), or a raw exploration of American b-movie sensibilities in Cruel Story of Youth.  Again and again, Oshima introduced a critical stance that would transgress social norms by exploring why certain dysfunctions are tolerated – witness the familial dysfunctions of Boy and 1971's The Ceremony or the examinations of racism in Death by Hanging and Three Resurrected Drunkards (both 1968), and why some are not, at least openly – the entanglements of sex, power and violence explicitly depicted in In the Realm of the Senses (1976), or  gay undercurrents located within samurai culture (a well-documented subject in publications, but not in film) in 1999's otherwise atypically serene Taboo (Gohatto).

Seijun Suzuki 
Seijun Suzuki's connections with the Japanese New Wave were more by association than by any actual endorsement of the term.  Suzuki had begun his career as a mainstream director of low-budget genre films like Underworld Beauty and Kanto Wanderer for Nikkatsu studios.

As noted by Japanese film critic Tadao Sato, Suzuki also represented a certain tradition in Japanese film: energizing normally conventional or even traditional styles with discreet infusions of unorthodox irreverence.  In Sato's assessment, Suzuki's precursors in some ways were Sadao Yamanaka and Mansaku Itami, whose unconventional humor reinvented period film during the 1930s.

Suzuki's stature as an influence upon the New Wave was cemented with two developments:  the desire to enliven the formulaic screenplays he was given by Nikkatsu (a deliberately overripe pop-art stylishness introduced in 1963's Youth of the Beast and Kanto Wanderer, both key, transitional films for Suzuki), and his 1968 dismissal from Nikkatsu.

In the wake of Kanto Wanderer, Suzuki's developing sense of style grew ever more surreal:  
  
What is standing there isn't really there.  It's just something reflected in our eyes.  When it is demolished, the consciousness that it is, or was, first begins to form.

This made clear Suzuki's anarchic approach to cinema, which coincided nicely with other developments during the 1960s.  1965's Tattooed Life took Yakuza formulas to comic-book extremes, with a deliberate and unreal heightening of melodrama and wildly anti-realistic violence, played for humor or for style (using strobe effects and glass floors to break down perspective expectations during one notable scene).  Beginning with this film, and continuing through Fighting Elegy and Tokyo Drifter (both from 1966) an accelerating move away from narrative, and towards greater spontaneity, enhanced with occasional Brechtian touches, became evident in Suzuki's work, though such elements were used in ways quite different from other filmmakers of the New Wave.

This hit a pinnacle with 1967's Branded to Kill, an elliptical, fragmented dive into allegory, satire and stylishness, built around a yakuza with a boiled rice fetish.  The film was regarded as "incomprehensible" by Nikkatsu, who sacked him (he didn't complete another feature for 9 years), but the largely non-narrative film plays like a compendium of global New Wave styles, absent the politics in most ways, though Suzuki's irreverence towards social convention is very clear, and the film's cult status grew at home and (ultimately) internationally.

Hiroshi Teshigahara 
Other filmmakers – notably Hiroshi Teshigahara – favored more experimental or allegorical terrain.  Alongside Hani, Teshigahara worked as an independent (excepting The Man Without a Map), apart from the studio system entirely.

Teshigahara – who was the son of a famed ikebana master (Sofu Teshigahara), began his career with a number of avant-garde shorts, including  Hokusai (1953), Ikebana (1956), Inochi (1958), Tokyo 1958 and José Torres (part 1) (1959); he had studied art at the Tokyo Art Institute.  He launched his feature career a few years later, frequently collaborating with avant-garde novelist Kōbō Abe, making a name for himself with the self-financed independent Pitfall (1962), which he described as a "documentary fantasy", and subsequently winning the jury prize at the 1964 Cannes Film Festival for Woman in the Dunes.

Both films, along with the subsequent The Face of Another (1966) and The Man Without a Map (1968) were co-scripted with Abe; in all four the search for self-definition in personal identity and for one's purpose in life is the driving theme, albeit related in allegorical fashion.  In 1971, Teshigahara completed an additional feature, Summer Soldiers, which was scripted by John Nathan (translator for Yukio Mishima and Kenzaburō Ōe), and focused on two American soldiers AWOL from the Vietnam War, and their attempt to hide in Japan.

Teshigahara would later retreat from filmmaking; after the retirement and death of his father he would take over his father's school, eventually becoming grandmaster.  After completing Summer Soldiers in 1971, Teshigahara would not make another film for 12 years, re-emerging with a minimalistic documentary about architect Antonio Gaudí.

Creative legacy 
The Japanese New Wave began to come apart (as it did in France) by the early 1970s; in the face of a collapsing studio system, major directors retreated into documentary work (Hani and – for a while – Imamura), other artistic pursuits (Teshigahara, who practiced sculpture and became grand master of an Ikebana school), or into international co-productions (Oshima).

In the face of such difficulties, a few of the key figures of the Japanese New Wave were still able to make notable films – Oshima's 1976 film In the Realm of the Senses became internationally famous in its blend of historical drama and aspects of pornography (drawn from an actual historical incident), and – after a return to filmmaking Teshigahara won acclaim for his experimentalistic documentary Antonio Gaudí (1984) and the features Rikyu (1989) and Princess Goh (1992).  Shōhei Imamura eventually became one of only four filmmakers to win the Palme d'Or at the Cannes Film Festival for multiple films – The Ballad of Narayama (1983), and The Eel (1997).

Key films associated with the Japanese New Wave 
(directors listed alphabetically within the year)

1950s

1956
 Children Who Draw, Susumu Hani (documentary)
 Punishment Room, Kon Ichikawa
 Crazed Fruit, Kō Nakahira
 Suzaki Paradise: Akashingō, Kawashima Yuzo

1957
 Kisses, Yasuzo Masumura
 Warm Current, Yasuzo Masumura
 Sun in the Last Days of the Shogunate, Kawashima Yuzo

1958
 Giants and Toys, Yasuzo Masumura

1959
 The Assignation, Kō Nakahira
 A Town of Love and Hope, Nagisa Oshima

1960s

1960
 Cruel Story of Youth, Nagisa Oshima
 The Sun's Burial, Nagisa Oshima
 Night and Fog in Japan, Nagisa Oshima
 Naked Island, Kaneto Shindo
 The Warped Ones, Koreyoshi Kurahara

1961
 Bad Boys, Susumu Hani
 Pigs and Battleships, Shōhei Imamura
 The Catch, Nagisa Oshima

1962
 The Revolutionary, Nagisa Oshima
 Pitfall, Hiroshi Teshigahara
 Harakiri,Masaki Kobayashi

1963
 She and He, Susumu Hani
 The Insect Woman, Shōhei Imamura

1964
 Intentions of Murder, Shōhei Imamura
 Assassination, Masahiro Shinoda
 Pale Flower, Masahiro Shinoda
Onibaba, Kaneto Shindo
 Gate of Flesh, Seijun Suzuki
 Tattooed Life, Seijun Suzuki
 Woman in the Dunes, Hiroshi Teshigahara

1965
 The Song of Bwana Toshi, Susumu Hani
 Sea of Youth, Shinsuke Ogawa (documentary)
 With Beauty and Sorrow, Masahiro Shinoda
 A Story Written with Water, Yoshishige Yoshida
 Kwaidan, Masaki Kobayashi

1966
 Bride of the Andes, Susumu Hani
 The Pornographers: An Introduction to Anthropology, Shōhei Imamura
Emotion, Nobuhiko Obayashi
 Violence at Noon, Nagisa Oshima
 Fighting Elegy, Seijun Suzuki
 Tokyo Drifter, Seijun Suzuki
 The Face of Another, Hiroshi Teshigahara

1967
 A Man Vanishes, Shōhei Imamura
 The Oppressed Students, Shinsuke Ogawa (documentary)
 Manual of Ninja Arts, Nagisa Oshima
 A Treatise on Japanese Bawdy Song, Nagisa Oshima
 Branded to Kill, Seijun Suzuki

1968
 Inferno of First Love, Susumu Hani
 Profound Desires of the Gods, Shōhei Imamura
 Summer in Narita, Shinsuke Ogawa (documentary)
 Death by Hanging, Nagisa Oshima
 Three Resurrected Drunkards, Nagisa Oshima
 The Man Without a Map, Hiroshi Teshigahara

1969
 Aido, Susumu Hani
 Ryakushô Renzoku Shasatsuma, Adachi Masao
 Eros Plus Massacre, Yoshishige Yoshida
 Funeral Parade of Roses, Toshio Matsumoto
 Boy, Nagisa Oshima
 Diary of a Shinjuku Thief, Nagisa Oshima
 Double Suicide, Masahiro Shinoda
 Go, Go Second Time Virgin, Kōji Wakamatsu

1970s

1970
 History of Postwar Japan as Told by a Bar Hostess, Shōhei Imamura (documentary)
 The Man Who Left His Will on Film, Nagisa Oshima
Heroic Purgatory, Yoshishige Yoshida
 Buraikan, Masahiro Shinoda
Live Today, Die Tomorrow, Kaneto Shindo

1971
 Red Army, Adachi Masao
 The Ceremony, Nagisa Oshima

 Throw Away Your Books, Rally in the Streets, Shuji Terayama
Emperor Tomato Ketchup, Shuji Terayama 
 Summer Soldiers, Hiroshi Teshigahara

1972
 Dear Summer Sister, Nagisa Oshima

1973
 Karayuki-san, the Making of a Prostitute, Shōhei Imamura (documentary)
 Coup d'État, Yoshishige Yoshida

1974
 Matsu the Untamed Comes Home, Shōhei Imamura (documentary)
 Pastoral, Shuji Terayama

1976
 God Speed You! Black Emperor, Yanagimachi Mitsuo (documentary)
 In the Realm of the Senses, Nagisa Oshima

1978
 Empire of Passion, Nagisa Oshima

1979
 Vengeance Is Mine, Shohei Imamura

See also 
 Cinema of Japan
 East Asian cinema

References

Notes

Works cited 
 Desser, David (1988).  Eros Plus Massacre: An Introduction to The Japanese New Wave Cinema. Indiana University Press, Bloomington.  .
 Mellen, Joan (1976). The Waves At Genji's Door: Japan Through Its Cinema. Pantheon, New York. .
 Oshima, Nagisa and Annette Michelson (1993).  Cinema, Censorship, and the State: The Writings of Nagisa Oshima. MIT Press, Boston. .
 Richie, Donald (2005). A Hundred Years of Japanese Film: A Concise History, with a Selective Guide to DVDs and Videos. Kodansha America, New York and Tokyo. .
 Richie, Donald (2004). Japan Journals 1947-2004. Stone Bridge, Berkeley. .
 Sato, Tadao (1982). Currents In Japanese Cinema. Kodansha America, New York and Tokyo. .
 Svensson, Arne (1971). Japan (Screen Series). Barnes, New York. .

External links 
 https://web.archive.org/web/20060303000105/http://citypages.com/databank/20/945/article6982.asp
 https://web.archive.org/web/20060112034217/http://www.walkerart.org/archive/9/B173714DE72D540B6161.htm

1960s in Japan
1970s in Japan
Movements in cinema
New Wave in cinema
Postwar Japan
History of film of Japan